This article itemizes the various lists of statistics topics.

Statistics 

 Outline of statistics
 Outline of regression analysis
 Index of statistics articles
 List of scientific method topics
 List of analyses of categorical data
 List of fields of application of statistics
 List of graphical methods
 List of statistical software
 Comparison of statistical packages
 List of graphing software
 Comparison of Gaussian process software
 List of stochastic processes topics
 List of matrices used in statistics
 Timeline of probability and statistics
 List of unsolved problems in statistics

Probability 

 Topic outline of probability
 List of probability topics
 Catalog of articles in probability theory
 List of probability distributions
 List of convolutions of probability distributions

Glossaries and notations 

 Glossary of experimental design
 Glossary of probability and statistics
 Notation in probability and statistics

People 

 List of actuaries
 List of statisticians
 List of mathematical probabilists
 Founders of statistics

Publications 

 List of important publications in statistics
 List of scientific journals in probability
 List of scientific journals in statistics
 Comparison of statistics journals

Organizations 

 List of academic statistical associations
 List of national and international statistical services

See also 

Lists of mathematics topics